Jujevan is a village in the Noyemberyan Municipality of the Tavush Province of Armenia.

History 
The village was founded in 1874, and is the site of the Jujevank Monastery dating from the 19th century and a 12th/13th-century chapel. Poploz-Gash, an Early Iron Age cyclopean fort and the Jaghatsategh settlement from the Early Bronze Age are also located nearby.

Demographics 
The village had 407 inhabitants in 2000, and 514 inhabitants in 2011.

Notable people 
Shahin Mustafayev, Azerbaijani politician, First Deputy Prime Minister and former Minister of Economic Development of the Republic of Azerbaijan

References

External links 

Село Джуджеван

Populated places in Tavush Province
Populated places established in 1874
1874 establishments in the Russian Empire